Sophie Lowe (born 5 June 1990) is a British-born Australian actress and singer-songwriter. She is known for appearing in films such as Beautiful Kate, Autumn Blood, After the Dark, Adore, Road Kill, Above Suspicion, Medieval and Blow the Man Down, and starring in the television series Once Upon a Time in Wonderland, The Slap, The Returned, and The Beautiful Lie.

Early life
Lowe was born in Sheffield, Yorkshire, England, and moved to Australia with her family in 2000. In her early teens, she signed to Chadwick Models but quit modelling in favour of acting.

Career

Acting 
Lowe's first roles were the short films Kindle, in which she played the lead role Hayley; Mirage, which was screened at the Montreal World Film Festival, and He. She. It., as well as a number of television advertisements before she graduated from The McDonald College in 2008.

Lowe's first substantial role was as the lead, Kate, in Beautiful Kate, which was released in 2009. For her role in Beautiful Kate, she was nominated for an AFI Award for Best Lead Actress. Her other credits include Natalie in the thriller film Blame, which was released in 2010. Blame was screened and received accolades at Cannes Film Festival, Melbourne International Film Festival, the 35th Toronto International Film Festival, the 47th Chicago International Film Festival and Buenos Aires International Film Festival of Independent Cinema.

In 2013, Lowe and her fellow McDonald College alumnus Rhys Wakefield co-wrote, co-directed, and starred in the short film A Man Walks Into a Bar... The film was a finalist at Sydney's Tropfest short film festival. Lowe and Wakefield previously worked together in the 2013 film After the Dark.

From 2013 to 2014, Lowe starred as Alice in Once Upon a Time in Wonderland, a spin-off of the TV series Once Upon a Time. The series ended after one season.

On 2 June 2014, Lowe was cast in the role of Lena in The Returned.

In 2015, Lowe starred in The Beautiful Lie, an Australian television series broadly based on Leo Tolstoy's novel Anna Karenina, playing Kitty Ballantyne, and filmed Waiting for the Miracle to Come, the feature film debut of Australian documentary filmmaker Lian Lunson. In 2016, she joined the independent Australian film Bloom, and Philip Noyce's thriller Above Suspicion.

In 2022, she starred in the Czech period drama film, Medieval, alongside Ben Foster, The film was directed by Petr Jákl and became the most expensive Czech film ever made. She is set to star alongside actress Louisa Krause in the to be announced film "The Dive".

Music

2013-2015: EP1 and EP2 
Lowe is also a singer-songwriter, originally performing under the alias SOLO. In December 2013, she released a five-song EP via the online music retailer Bandcamp. The music video for the song "Dreaming", one of the songs from the SOLO EP, was directed by actress and After the Dark co-star Bonnie Wright. She later dropped the SOLO name and performed under her real name. In October 2015, she re-released independently her first record as Sophie Lowe, titled EP1. On the next month, in November 2015, she released her second EP titled EP2, with seven songs. Her second extendend play saw a departing of her Alt-folk sound, with EP2 embracing a more Electropop production while remaining as an Alternative record. To promote the project, Lowe released three singles; "Understand", "Pink Flowers" and "Breathe", the first two end up getting a respective music video. As 2020, the music video for "Understand" directed by Dean Francis, is no longer available to stream on her YouTube page. The music video for "Pink Flowers" was co-directed by Lowe herself and Lily Rolfe.

2016-present: Trust and new singles 
Since 2016, Lowe has release a bunch of stand-alone singles, starting in August when she released a collaboration with TWINKIDS titled, "Mean" with the music video being directed by Patrick Fileti and herself. In the same year, she starred in the music video from Australian electronic producer Flume and Canadian singer Kai, titled "Never Be Like You" alongside actor Sam Reid, which has over 40 million views on YouTube.

In October 2017, she released the single, "Trust". The song went to be featured on tv series such as The Bold Type and Charmed. As November 2022, the single is her most popular song on Spotify with over 1 million streams.

In September 2018. she released the single, "Taught You How To Feel", music video was directed by Bonnie Wright, making this her second collaboration between them, since the single "Dreaming" in 2013.

On 11 May 2021, Lowe released the single, "I Don't Want You Around", the music video was directed and edited by herself. After three years since the release of her last single, Lowe returned with the Indie pop song "From the Inside" which was released on January 24, 2023 alongside the official music video, which co-stars fellow Australian actor and model James Frecheville.

Personal life 
Speaking to the media in October 2015, Lowe said she had a two-fold focus. When she had free time between acting, she tried to do as much music as she could. She stated that she would not give up acting for the sake of her burgeoning musical career. "There's no way I'm not acting," she said, "because that's my life."

In 2018, it was confirmed that Lowe was dating Australian singer-songwriter Vance Joy, after he thanked and called her, "My girlfriend Sophie" in his acceptance speech at the ARIA Music Awards. They eventually broke up, without revealing any information on the subject.

Discography

Extended plays 

 EP 1 (2015)
 EP 2 (2015)

Filmography

Feature films

Short films

Television

Music Videos

Awards and nominations

References

External links

 
 
 Sophie Lowe at Youtube

1990 births
Living people
21st-century Australian actresses
Actresses from Yorkshire
Australian child actresses
Australian film actresses
Australian singer-songwriters
Australian television actresses
British emigrants to Australia
Actresses from Sheffield
21st-century Australian singers
21st-century English women
21st-century English people